WOYK (1350 AM) is a commercial radio station licensed to York, Pennsylvania, and also serving the Harrisburg, and Lancaster radio markets.  The station is owned by the York Revolution.  The Revolution is an Atlantic League of Professional Baseball team, whose games air on WOYK.

The station's transmitter is off North Emig Mill Road in West Manchester Township, Pennsylvania.  WOYK broadcasts at 5,000 watts by day, using a non-directional antenna.  But at night, to protect other stations on AM 1350, it switches to a directional antenna and drops to 1,000 watts. WOYK's programming is also simulcast on translator station W255DJ (98.9 FM).

WOYK airs a sports radio format, primarily from the Fox Sports Radio and also airing the syndicated Dan Patrick Show.

History
WOYK is the oldest radio station in York, having signed on the air on March 17, 1932.  For most of its history it used the call sign WORK.  It was first owned by the York Broadcasting Company and was powered at 1,000 watts, heard on AM 1000.  After the enactment of the North American Regional Broadcasting Agreement (NARBA) in 1941, it switched to its current frequency at AM 1350.

WORK was an affiliate of the NBC Red Network and the Mutual Broadcasting System, carrying their dramas, comedies, news, sports, soap operas, game shows and big band broadcasts during the "Golden Age of Radio."  In the 1950s, it got a boost to 5,000 watts by day, while still broadcasting at 1,000 watts at night, its current power.  As network programming moved to television, WORK switched to a full service middle of the road music format.  In the 1980s, as WOYK, it shifted to an oldies format before going to all-sports in the 1990s.

The station has a rich history of sports broadcasting going back to the 1930s. During its history, WORK carried the Baltimore Orioles from the 1950s through the early 1980s and then again from 2007 to 2009.

For many years, through the 1960s, the station carried Philadelphia Phillies baseball as well.  For years, NFL football games, featuring the Baltimore Colts, were carried. WOYK has a long history of carrying local high school and college sports. The station currently broadcasts York Revolution minor league baseball, Hershey Bears hockey, York College of Pennsylvania basketball, NCAA basketball, and professional football, including the playoffs and the Super Bowl. As of the 2022 season, WOYK now broadcasts Philadelphia Eagles football games.

In March 2019, WOYK added a 250-watt translator station, 98.9 W255DJ, and rebranded as "SportsRadio 98.9 & WOYK 1350."

Translator

References

External links

Sports radio stations in the United States
OYK
Radio stations established in 1932
Fox Sports Radio stations
1932 establishments in Pennsylvania